Trix Vivier (born 28 June 1988) is a South African film, television and theater actress, who is known for portraying the role of Flea van Jaarsveld in the 2019 television series Trackers, for which she gained prominence and national recognition, as well as for her role as Kate Myburgh in kykNet and Showmax's co-production of Waterfront.

Her breakout role was that of Vicky Ferreira in the kykNET youth series Sterlopers. Vivier portrayed this role from 2014 – 2016 over two seasons.

Vivier joined the lead cast of the TV series Legacy, for season one as one of the lead female protagonists, Petra Potgieter, in 2020.

Early life 
Vivier was born in Melkbosstrand, Cape Town, and raised by her mother Adri Vivier, a teacher and father Pieter Vivier, an advocate. Vivier is from Afrikaans descent and has three siblings. Her younger sister Lea Vivier is also an actress.

Her parents noticed and encouraged her passion for the performing arts from a young age and she made her professional stage debut at age 15 in Annie Get Your Gun (Gilbert and Sullivan Society, 2004) and at age 16 in Die Ander Marta (KKNK, Baxter Theatre 2005)  Vivier Matriculated from Jan van Riebeeck High School and went on to study and graduate from the Waterfront Theater School in Cape Town in 2009.

Career 

Vivier's first paid theater role was that of Pippi in The National Children's Theater production of Pippi Longstocking (2009)

She continued to work professionally as dancer and actor from 2009 to 2013 performing in plays such as Reza de Wet's MIS, educational theater musicals both locally and abroad and many Children's Theater Productions  before landing her first Television role in the kykNET youth drama series Sterlopers (2013 – 2016).

She subsequently went on to portray lead roles in television series such as Trackers.

Filmography

Further reading 
 https://www.pressreader.com/south-africa/rooi-rose/20190101/281775630215840
 https://www.pressreader.com/south-africa/huisgenoot/20191121/283893049859680
 https://www.vrouekeur.co.za/bekendes/10-vrae-aan-trix-vivier
 https://stories.showmax.com/deon-meyers-trackers-is-top-on-showmax/
 https://www.netwerk24.com/huisgenoot/Bekendes/lea-trix-en-moeder-adri-ma-en-dogters-bekoor-sa-op-tv-20210219

References

External links 
 https://www.imdb.com/name/nm6366742/
 https://www.apm.co.za/artiste/trix-vivier-836/
 https://www.instagram.com/trixvivier

Living people
1988 births
South African actresses
Alumni of Hoërskool Jan van Riebeeck